Amygdaloid, derived from the ancient Greek for almond, may refer to:
 The amygdala in the brain
 Any shape resembling an almond nut
 Amygdule, or amygdale, a mineral filled vesicle in volcanic rock, amygdaloidal texture
 Amygdaloid Island, an island in Lake Superior